24 Frames may refer to:

 24 Frames, a single from the Jason Isbell album, Something More Than Free
 24 Frames (film), an Iranian film